Ludborough is a village and civil parish in the East Lindsey district of Lincolnshire, England. Ludborough has a population of 191 people. The Prime Meridian passes to the east of the village.

History
Evidence of Neolithic activity in the area was confirmed by a find, in the 1970s, of a stone axe believed to be of the Langdale type. While aerial photographs in 2010 led to the identification of a rectangular enclosure dating to the Iron Age or Roman period as cropmarks.

In A Dictionary of British Place Names, A.D. Mills interprets Ludborough's name to mean a 'fortified place' that may be associated in some way with the Lincolnshire town of Louth.

In the Domesday Book of 1086, Ludborough had 38 freeman and was considered 'very large'. Before the Conquest lordship was held by Thorgot Lag, and after, Berengar of Tosny, with Robert of Tosny as tenant-in-chief and the head of the manor at Binbrook.

On 4 May 1297, King Henry III granted the manor holders, Richard de Breuse and his wife Alic, the right to hold a market in the village.

The parish church, dedicated to St. Mary, retains elements from the 13th to the 15th century but was substantially renovated by James Fowler in 1858. Following the lengthy closure for renovation the church was re-opened on 1 May 1860.

In 1821, the parish had a population of 281, and had 45 homes. Around this time, part of the south aisle of St. Mary's Church was used as a school.

Community
Ludborough is noted for its railway station, the base for the heritage Lincolnshire Wolds Railway.

References

External links

Villages in Lincolnshire
Civil parishes in Lincolnshire
East Lindsey District